Apostolatus may refer to :

Cum ex apostolatus officio is the name of a papal bull issued by Pope Paul IV on February 15, 1559.
E supremi apostolatus was a papal encyclical (On High) issued by Pope Pius X on October 4, 1903.
In eminenti apostolatus was a Papal Bull issued by Pope Clement XII on 28 April 1738, banning Catholics from becoming Freemasons.
In supremo apostolatus is a papal bull issued by Pope Gregory XVI regarding the institution of slavery.
Societas Apostolatus Catholici is a name given to the Pallotines.
Supremi apostolatus officio is an encyclical on the Rosary by Pope Leo XIII.